Blue Foundation is an album by the band Blue Foundation.

Track listing

References 

2001 albums
Blue Foundation albums